Bruno Stefanini (August 5, 1924 – December 14, 2018) was a Swiss real estate investor and art collector.

Life 

Born on August 5, 1924, in Winterthur, Switzerland, Bruno Stefanini did not come from a wealthy family. He set up his real estate company Terresta AG next to the restaurant run by his father on Marktgasse in Winterthur. He passed the entrance examination to the ETH Zurich, completed recruit school and served in the army up to the rank of captain. He abandoned his studies in natural sciences in favor of a career in the real estate industry.

Real estate 

Stefanini owned many properties in the city including, part of Steinberggasse in Winterthur's old town. He also owned the Sulzer high-rise building.. In 2009, the city had two properties on Steinberggasse scaffolded because of danger to passers-by. His castles, including Salenstein Castle, also fell into disrepair, leading to media reports.

Stefanini owned an estimated 280 properties in Switzerland. His personal history was considered somewhat mysterious and excited interest. He had transferred most of his assets to his foundation, which he set up in 1980.

Foundation for Art, Culture and History 
Stefanini invested a large part of his fortune in art. In 2023, the New York Times estimated his collection at more than 100,000 pieces, including 6,000 oil paintings. His Foundation for Art, Culture and History (Stiftung für Kunst, Kultur und Geschichte or SKKG) is one of the most important private art collections in Switzerland, in addition to possessing four castles and various curiosities. Artworks include works by Ferdinand Hodler, Albert Anker, Giovanni Giacometti, Alberto Giacometti, Giovanni Segantini, Felix Vallotton, Angelika Kauffmann, Ottilie Roederstein, Alice Bailly, Helen Dahm, Meret Oppenheim and Niki de Saint Phalle. The four castles of Grandson on Lake Neuchâtel, Luxburg and Salenstein in Thurgau, and Brestenberg in Aargau also belong to the foundation.

Stefanini owed many unique items and curiosities, including the Rolls-Royce von Joe Carstairs, the death bed and will of Napoleon Bonaparte, an officer cap, coat, dagger and pocket watch von General Guisan, and a dress of Kaiserin «Sisi».  Only a small part of this collection is open to the public. The value of the entire collection is estimated at over 1.5 billion Swiss francs, the objects at approximately 34,000 pieces.

Considered media-shy, Stefanini's last public appearance took place in March 2014 at a vernissage of the Kunstmuseum Bern. In 2016 the historian Miguel Garcia published a biography in German entitled: Bruno Stefanini: Ein Jäger und Sammler mit hohen Idealen.

Legacy 
On December 17, 2014, the Foundation was the object of a dispute. The descendants Bettina and Vital Stefanini appointed a new Board of Trustees before the expiry of the term of office of the Board of Trustees elected by founder Bruno Stefanini, prompting the intervention of the supervisory authority. The Swiss Federal Supervisory Authority for Foundations reversed the step taken by the descendants and reinstated the board of trustees elected by the founder. In an order dated January 30, 2015, the Federal Supervisory Authority for Foundations appointed the Bernese lawyer Stephan Herren as administrator. In March 2018, the Federal Supreme Court ruled in favor of Bruno Stefanini's children, the Federal Supervisory Authority for Foundations terminated the mandate of the trustee, and daughter Bettina Stefanini took over the presidency of the foundation board. She had returned to Winterthur from Ireland in 2018 to "represent the interests of my father, who suffers from dementia, and his foundation." The previous members of the foundation board had to step down.

Provenance research project 
In 2023, the Foundation announced a provenance research project to examine the collection for looted art.

Literature 

 Miguel Garcia: Bruno Stefanini. Ein Jäger und Sammler mit hohen Idealen. Verlag Neue Zürcher Zeitung, Zürich 2016, ISBN 978-3-03810-146-8.
 Bruno Stefanini im Winterthur Glossar.

Weblinks 

 «Bruno Stefanini führt durch sein Sulzer Hochhaus», Radiobeitrag auf DRS 1 vom 9. Oktober 2009.
 Felix Schindler: , Zeitungsartikel im Tages-Anzeiger von 11. November 2009.
 Website der Stiftung für Kunst, Kultur und Geschichte
 Florian Schwab, Weltwoche 38/2014: Vom Secondo zum Milliardär.
 Reto Flury: Der rätselhafte Multimillionär, der sammelte, bis er nicht mehr konnte. NZZ, 15. Dezember 2018.

References 

2018 deaths
Swiss art collectors
Swiss people
1924 births